Potshot may refer to:

 Potshot (band), a former J-ska music group from Japan
 Potshot (novel), a Spenser novel by Robert B. Parker
 Potshot Lake, Minnesota, an unorganized territory
 Potshot, the codename for a WWII base that is now Exmouth, Western Australia
 Pot-shots, a form of literary art attributed to epigrammist Ashleigh Brilliant

See also
 Poshot, a village in Sistan and Baluchestan Province, Iran